Didn't It Rain is the second studio album by English actor and musician Hugh Laurie.

Recorded in Ocean Way Studios in Los Angeles in January 2013, the album contains several blues songs (like its predecessor, Let Them Talk ). Unlike his previous album, however, Laurie also branches further into other Southern US and South American genres, including jazz, R&B, and tango.

Similarly to Let Them Talk, Laurie once again plays piano and guitar, and often provides vocals. Additionally, Laurie is joined by guest musicians Gaby Moreno, Jean McClain, and Taj Mahal, and is supported throughout by the Copper Bottom Band.

Didn't It Rain was released in the UK on 6 May 2013, with iTunes providing pre-order and digital releases, and Amazon providing vinyl prints and a special book edition. As a promotion for a Huffington Post interview regarding Laurie's album and upcoming tour, the album had a 24-hour free streaming period in several countries. It was released in the United States on 6 August 2013.

The miniature piano seen on the album artwork was given to Laurie on a 2009 episode of Friday Night with Jonathan Ross.

Track listing

Personnel
 Greg Leisz – acoustic guitar, electric guitar, lap steel guitar, dobro, mandola, mandolin
 Patrick Warren – accordion, Hammond b-3 organ, pump organ, keyboards
 Vincent Henry – vocals, harmonica, clarinet, bass clarinet, soprano saxophone, tenor saxophone, baritone saxophone
 Jay Bellerose – drums, percussion
 Larry Goldings – Hammond b-3 organ
 Kevin Breit – acoustic guitar, electric guitar, lap steel guitar, tenor banjo, mandocello, mandola, mandolin, background vocals
 Jean McClain – background vocals
 Elizabeth Lea – trombone
 David Plitch – upright bass, electric bass
 Hugh Laurie – vocals, acoustic guitar, whistle, piano, Wurlitzer organ
 Robby Marshall – clarinet, bass clarinet, alto saxophone, tenor saxophone

Also 
 Taj Mahal
 Gaby Moreno

Tour
Following the album's release, a promotional tour was set to span the UK and several countries starting on 31 May 2013. The tour began in Belarus, and continued across mainland Europe. After covering five EU capitals, it toured several cities in the United Kingdom, before concluding back in mainland Europe.

Charts and certifications

Weekly charts

Year-end charts

Certifications

|-

References

External links
Official website

Hugh Laurie albums
2013 albums
Albums produced by Joe Henry
Warner Records albums